Rolf Christensen (August 4, 1894 – May 18, 1962) was a Norwegian actor and film director who was particularly well known for his roles in operettas, plays, and farces.

Christensen debuted on stage in 1918 at the Trondheim National Theater and was engaged from 1922 to 1935 with the National Theater. He was engaged with the Central Theater from 1935 onward, both as an actor and director. Most of his work, both as an actor and a director, was in operettas, plays, and farces. An exception was his dramatic leading role in Toralf Sandø's production of Victor Borg's play Jeg drepte! (I Have Killed), which he performed at the Central Theater in 1941 and reprised in the film of the same name a year later.

He made his film debut in 1921 with a supporting role in Growth of the Soil, and adaptation of Knut Hamsun's novel of the same name. He played the lead role in the film Jeg drepte! and also had supporting roles in films such as Pan (1922), De vergeløse (1939), Tørres Snørtevold (1940), and Kasserer Jensen (1954).

Christensen was among the founders of the Guild of Norwegian Directors (Norsk Sceneinstruktørforening).

Filmography
 1921: Growth of the Soil
 1922: Pan, as the doctor
 1937: Bra mennesker (Good People), as Gullik Kremmer
 1939: De vergeløse (The Defenceless), as Myrbråten, a smallholder 
 1940: Tørres Snørtevold, as the school principal 
 1942: Jeg drepte! (I Have Killed!), as Gunnar Bøhmer, a doctor
 1942: Det æ'kke te å tru (It's Unbelievable), as Olsen, an accountant
 1946: To liv, as Sahlmann, a subagent
 1954: Kasserer Jensen (Jensen the Cashier), as the prosecutor
 1954: Portrettet (The Portrait), as Wilhelm Borch, a painter 
 1955: The Summer Wind Blows, as Kristian Aare 
 1957: Stevnemøte med glemte år (Meeting with Forgotten Years) 
 1959: The Master and His Servants
 1961: The Passionate Demons, as Jacob's father

References

External links

1894 births
1962 deaths
Norwegian male film actors
Norwegian male silent film actors
20th-century Norwegian male actors
Norwegian film directors
People from Skien